Cleonymia warionis is a moth of the family Noctuidae first described by Charles Oberthür in 1876. It is known from localities in Algeria, Morocco, Libya and Israel.

Adults are on wing from January to March. There is one generation per year.

External links

Cuculliinae
Moths described in 1876
Moths of the Middle East